The 1942 NFL Championship Game was the tenth title game of the National Football League (NFL), played at Griffith Stadium in Washington, D.C. on December 13, with a sellout capacity attendance of 36,006.

It matched the undefeated Western Division champion Chicago Bears (11–0) and the Eastern Division champion Washington Redskins (10–1). The Bears
were co-coached by Hunk Anderson and Luke Johnsos (after George Halas had entered the U.S. Navy) and led on the field by quarterback Sid Luckman. The Redskins were led by head coach Ray Flaherty and quarterback Sammy Baugh.

Chicago had won easily in the summer exhibition game with Washington, but the teams had not met during the 1942 regular season. The Bears were aiming for their third consecutive league title and were favored by three touchdowns, but were upset 14–6 by the home underdog Redskins.

Tickets were sold out three weeks in advance, and some were being resold for up to fifty dollars.

This was the second and final NFL title game played at Griffith Stadium and in the city of Washington. The two teams met on the same site two years earlier with a very different result, as the visiting Bears won in a 73–0 rout.

Scoring summary
Sunday, December 13, 1942
Kickoff: 2 p.m. EWT (EDT)

 First quarter
 no scoring
 Second quarter
 CHI – Lee Artoe, 52-yard fumble return (kick failed), 6–0 CHI
 WAS – Wilbur Moore, 39-yard pass from Baugh (Bob Masterson kick), 7–6 WAS
 Third quarter
 WAS – Andy Farkas, 1-yard run (Masterson kick), 14–6 WAS
 Fourth quarter
 no scoring
Source:

Officials
Referee: Ronald Gibbs
Umpire: Carl Brubaker 
Head Linesman: Charlie Berry
Field Judge: Chuck Sweeney

Players' shares
The gate receipts from the sellout were over $113,000, a record, and each Redskin player received about $976 while each Bear saw about $639.

Next year
At the time, an owners' winter meeting and the annual draft of college players  was held around the title game. A year into World War II for the United States and with much of the talent in or entering the military, the meeting focused on whether or not to operate the league in 1943; the decision was to continue, with the 1943 NFL draft postponed until April.

References

Champ
1942 NFL Championship Game
Chicago Bears postseason
Washington Redskins postseason
NFL Championship Game
December 1942 sports events